Siham Mousa Hamoud Jabr Al Moussawi (l; born 1983), is an Iraqi politician. She has a bachelor's degree and served as a member of the Council of Representatives for the governorate of Qadisiyah in its thirdsession (2014-2018) for State of Law Coalition inside Badr Organization. She wom the Iraqi legislative elections for 2018 with a total of 6,885votes.

References

1983 births
Living people
Members of the Council of Representatives of Iraq
21st-century Iraqi women politicians
21st-century Iraqi politicians
Badr Brigade members